Anton Buttigieg,  (19 February 1912 – 5 May 1983) was a Maltese political figure and poet. He served as the second president of Malta from 1976 until 1981.

Early life

Anton Buttigieg was born in Qala, Gozo, on 19 February 1912, the third child of Salvatore and Concetta (née Falzon) Buttigieg. He was educated at the Government Primary School, Qala (from 1916 to 1922), the Gozo Seminary (from 1923 to 1927), St Aloysius' College Malta (from 1928 to 1930) and the University of Malta, where he graduated Bachelor of Arts in 1934, and Doctor of Laws in 1940.

Marriages

In 1944 he married Censina and had three children – John,  Rose and Emanuel. She then died.

In 1953 he married Connie Scicluna, who also predeceased him.

In 1975, he married, lastly, to Margery Patterson.

Career

During World War II (1942–1944), he served in the Maltese Police Force as an Inspector, and after he practised the law. In 1955, he also served as an acting Magistrate. He was the law reporter and leader writer of the Times of Malta from 1946 to 1948, and the Editor of The Voice of Malta from 1959 to 1970.

Political life

He embarked on a political career and was first elected to the Legislative Assembly for the Labour Party in 1955. He was re-elected in all subsequent elections and held his seat in Parliament up to the time of his resignation in October 1976. From 1959 to 1961 he was President of the Malta Labour Party and from 1962 to 1976 its Deputy Leader. When the present administration took office in 1971, he served his country as Deputy Prime Minister and Minister of Justice and Parliamentary Affairs.

He was a delegate to the Malta Constitutional Conferences held in London in 1958 and in 1964. He was also a representative to the Consultative Assembly in the Council of Europe (1967–1971), where he was elected vice-president (1967–1968). In October 1976 he resigned from the House of Representatives.

Presidency

On 27 December 1976, he was elected as the second President of Malta to replace Sir Anthony Mamo.

Poetry

Buttigieg also distinguished himself in the field of literature. During his undergraduate days he was one of the founder members of the 'Għaqda tal-Malti – Università' (26 January 1931). He was a Member of the L-Akkademja tal-Malti (Academy of the Maltese Language).

Awards

 In 1971 he won First Prize for Poetry by the Maltese government.
 In 1972 he won the Ġuzé Muscat Azzopardi prize for poetry.
 In 1975 the Circolo Culturale Rhegium Julii of Reggio Calabria awarded him with a silver plaque for his poetry.
 In 1977 he won the International Prize of Mediterranean Culture for Poetry, awarded by the Centro di Cultura Mediterranea of Palermo.
 In 1979 he was awarded First Prize and a Special Diploma for Poetry in the First Category by the Centro Culturale Artistico Letterario – Città di Brindisi.
 In 1979 he won the Malta Literary Award's 1st prize for the first volume of his auto-biography Toni tal-Baħri (Toni, the Seaman's Son, published 1978).

Publications

Lyrical poetry

 Mill-Gallarija ta' Żgħożiti (From the Balcony of my Youth; 1949)
 Fanali bil-Lejl (Lamps in the Night; 1949)
 Fl-Arena (In the Arena; 1970)
 Ballati Maltin (Maltese Ballads; 1973)
 Il Mare di Malta (The Sea of Malta, a selection of poems written in Italian in 1974)
 Il-Għanja tas-Sittin (The Song of the Sixty Year Old; 1975)
 The Lamplighter - poems translated into English (1977)
 Qabs el Mosbah - poems translated into Arabic (1978)
 Poeżiji Miġbura – L-ewwel Volum: the first two books, From the Balcony of my Youth and Lamps in the Night were published in 1978 in one volume under the title Collected Poems

humorous Poetry!

 Ejjew nidħku ftit (Let us laugh a little; 1963)
 Ejjew nidħku ftit ieħor (Let us laugh a little more; 1966)

Haiku and tanka

 Il-Muża bil-Kimono (The Muse in Kimono); this was translated both into both Japanese and English in 1968

References

External links
www.antonbuttigieg.com - with all the literary works of Anton Buttigieg.

1912 births
1983 deaths
Presidents of Malta
People from Qala, Malta
University of Malta alumni
Maltese male poets
Labour Party (Malta) politicians
Maltese police officers
Maltese Roman Catholics
Deputy Prime Ministers of Malta
20th-century Maltese poets
20th-century male writers
Haiku poets
20th-century Maltese politicians